Shelley Morten (born November 24, 1959) is a retired Canadian wrestler, current wrestling coach, and documentary film director and producer.  As a competitor, Morten won gold in the Canadian Wrestling Championships three times and represented Canada at the World Wrestling Championships in 1995, placing seventh. She was BC Wrestling Women's Senior Athlete of the year 1995. After retiring from competition, Morten became a coach for the British Columbia women's wrestling team, and won the BC Blind Sports President's Award in 1999. She is a co-founder of VanWestFilm Productions, which recently released a documentary titled Wrestling With Attitude (2012) about the evolution of women's wrestling in Canada. Morten is married to deaf-blind judoka and wrestler Pier Morten, who has won four medals at the Paralympic Games.

See also
Wrestling in Canada

References

External links

Video
Trailer for Wrestling with Attitude (VanWestFilm Productions on YouTube)

1959 births
Living people
Canadian female sport wrestlers
Sportspeople from Halifax, Nova Scotia